Al Muzaffar III Mahmud was the Ayyubid emir of Hama from 1284–1300. He was the son of Al-Mansur Muhammad II whom he succeeded.  Hama was at this time a tributary emirate of the Mamluk Sultanate.

Biography
Al Muzaffar took part in the siege of Acre in 1291, bringing a large mangonel from Krak des Chevaliers to support the assault on the city.  Although a few small Crusader enclaves survived, the fall of Acre marked the end of the Crusader period in Syria and thereafter Mamluks rule was unchallenged.

When he died in 1300 Hama was briefly under direct Mamluk rule, but in 1310 Al Muzaffar’s cousin Abu'l-Fida was made emir, and there was a final period of Ayyubid tributary rule in the city.

References

1300 deaths
13th-century Ayyubid rulers
Ayyubid emirs of Hama
Sunni Muslims
Year of birth unknown
13th-century people from the Mamluk Sultanate